Margaret of Burgundy (October 1374 – 8 March 1441) was Duchess of Bavaria as the wife of Duke William II and the mother of Jacqueline, Countess of Hainaut

Life
Margaret was the third child and first daughter out of nine children born to Philip II, Duke of Burgundy, and Margaret III, Countess of Flanders. Margaret's father used the marriages of his children to achieve far-sighted goals. In keeping with this strategy, Margaret and her brother John were wedded in a double marriage to William of Bavaria and his sister Margaret. This marriage, celebrated on 12 April 1385 in Cambrai, would later influence the union of Hainaut and Holland with Burgundy and Flanders, as carried out by Margaret's nephew Philip the Good.

Margaret exerted a lot of political influence during the reign of her spouse: William ruled both Holland and Hainaut, but preferred Holland and spent a lot of his reign there. Margaret thus governed Hainaut in his name.

After 16 years of childless marriage, Margaret gave birth to a daughter, Jacqueline, on 16 August 1401. Margaret's political position increased in the 1410s, as she was granted several towns and castles as her personal fiefs.

William died in 1417 from an infection which developed after he was bitten by a dog. Although he and Margaret attempted to ensure that their daughter would inherit all his lands, a war of succession broke out after his death. Jacqueline would eventually come to inherit Hainaut, Holland, and Zeeland, but not Bavaria. During the reign of her daughter, Margaret was involved in several political acts. She preferred the Le Quesnoy castle as her residence, which was also her personal fief. She died at Le Quesnoy on 8 March 1441, having outlived her childless daughter.

Ancestry

References

External links

People from Montbard
1374 births
1441 deaths
House of Valois-Burgundy
House of Wittelsbach
Countesses of Holland
Countesses of Hainaut
People from Le Quesnoy